Condowie is a locality in South Australia's Mid North. The locality is named for an Aboriginal word meaning "good water".

Condowie was a stop on the Brinkworth–Kadina railway line which opened in 1894 and closed in 1990. It was midway between Snowtown and Brinkworth.

See also
List of cities and towns in South Australia

References

External links
Wakefield Regional Council

Towns in South Australia